The following is a list of notable traditional gentlemen's clubs in the United States, including those that are now defunct. Historically, these clubs were exclusively for men, but most (though not all) now admit women.

On exclusivity and assimilation into the upper class 

Christopher Doob explains in his book Social Inequality and Social Stratification in U.S. Society: 

E. Digby Baltzell, sociologist of the WASP establishment, explains in his book Philadelphia Gentlemen: The Making of a National Upper Class:

History
The traditional gentlemen's club originated in London (in particular the St James's area) in the 18th century as a successor to coffeehouses. Today, these clubs also continue to operate in the United States. The five oldest existing American clubs are the South River Club in South River, Maryland (c.1690/1700), the Schuylkill Fishing Company in Andalusia, Pennsylvania (1732), the Old Colony Club in Plymouth, Massachusetts (1769), The Philadelphia Club in Philadelphia (1834), and the Union Club of the City of New York in New York City (1836). The Boston Club, of New Orleans, named after the card game and not the city, is the oldest southern club, founded in 1841. The five oldest existing clubs west of the Mississippi River are the Pacific Club in Honolulu (1851), the Pacific-Union Club (1852), Olympic Club (1860), and Concordia-Argonaut Club (1864), all in San Francisco, and the Arlington Club in Portland, Oregon (1867).

Present day
While most major American cities today have at least one gentlemen's club, they are most prevalent in older cities, especially those on the East Coast. As detailed below, only thirteen American cities have five or more such clubs: Atlanta, Boston, Chicago, Cincinnati, Denver, Detroit, Los Angeles, New Orleans, New York City, Philadelphia, Pittsburgh, San Francisco, Seattle, and Washington, D.C. Also as detailed below, New York City contains more than any other American city, including the Yale Club of New York City, the largest traditional gentlemen's club in the world. Throughout the country, though, many clubs have reciprocal relationships with the older clubs in London, with each other, and with other gentlemen's clubs around the world.

A few American gentlemen's clubs maintain separate "city" and "country" clubhouses, essentially functioning as both a traditional gentlemen's club in one location and a country club in another: the Piedmont Driving Club in Atlanta, the Wisconsin Club in Milwaukee, the New York Athletic Club in New York City, the Union League of Philadelphia, the Missouri Athletic Club in St. Louis, and the Olympic Club in San Francisco. Similarly, the Jonathan Club in Los Angeles functions as a traditional gentlemen's club in one location and a beach club in another.

Because the term "gentlemen's club" is commonly used in the United States to refer euphemistically to strip clubs, traditional gentlemen's clubs often are referred to as "men's clubs" or "city clubs" (as opposed to country clubs) or simply as "private social clubs" or just "private clubs". For other meanings and nuances of the word "club", see club.

List

Alabama
 Birmingham
 The Birmingham Athletic Club (1886–1926), insolvent
 The Birmingham Athletic Club (1999–2009), insolvent
 The Club (1951)
 The Phoenix Club (1883–1926), moved to Shades Mountain and became a country club
 The Southern Club (1883–1931), insolvent
 Mobile
 The Athelstan Club (1875)
 The Bienville Club (1967–2013), insolvent
 The International Trade Club (1966–2009), insolvent
 Tuscaloosa
 The University Club of the University of Alabama (1944)

Alaska
 Anchorage
 The Petroleum Club of Anchorage (1958)

Arizona
 Phoenix
 The Arizona Club (1894–2009), insolvent
 The University Club of Phoenix (1965)
 Tempe
 The University Club of Arizona State University (1989)

 Tucson
 The Mountain Oyster Club (1948)

Arkansas
 Little Rock
 The Little Rock Club (1969)

California
 Bakersfield
 The Petroleum Club of Bakersfield (1952)
 Berkeley
 The Berkeley City Club (1927)
 The Berkeley Faculty Club (1902)

 Eureka
 The Ingomar Club (1950)

 Fresno
 The Downtown Club (1963–2013), insolvent
 Long Beach
 The Long Beach Petroleum Club (1953)
 Los Angeles
 The Academy of Magical Arts (1952)
 The California Club (1887)
 The Jonathan Club (1895)
 The Los Angeles Athletic Club (1880)
 The Regency Club (1981–2011), insolvent
 The University Club of Los Angeles (1898–1992), insolvent

 Modesto
 Old Fisherman's Club
 Monterey
 Pacheco Club (1957)
 Newport Beach
 The Pacific Club (1981), which presents the Lott Trophy
 Oakland
 The Bellevue Club (1929) (Never a gentlemen's club, it was exclusively for women until 1973)
 The Lakeview Club (1984–2000), insolvent
 Palo Alto
 The Stanford Faculty Club (1908)
 The University Club of Palo Alto (1952)
 Pasadena
 The Athenaeum at Caltech (1930)
 The Pasadena Athletic Club (1926–2007), insolvent
 The University Club of Pasadena (1922)
 Sacramento
 The Sutter Club (1889)
 San Diego
 The Faculty Club (1975)
 The University Club of San Diego (1896)
 San Francisco
 Bankers Club
 The Bohemian Club (1872), which hosts the Bohemian Grove retreat
 The Cercle de l'Union ("the French Club") (1905)
 The City Club of San Francisco (1930), until 1987 called the Pacific Stock Exchange Lunch Club
 The Concordia-Argonaut Club (1864)
 The Family (1901), founded by members of the Bohemian Club who left in a dispute
 The Marines Memorial Club (1946)
 The Norwegian Club of San Francisco (1898)
 The Olympic Club (1860)
 The Pacific-Union Club (1852)
 The University Club of San Francisco (1890)
 The Villa Taverna (1960)

 San Jose
 The Metropolitan University Club (1936–1990), created from merger of previous Metropolitan Social & Athletic Club (1936) and University Club of San Jose (1957), insolvent
 The Sainte Claire Club (1895)
 The Silicon Valley Athletic Club (1981), until 2012 called the San Jose Athletic Club

 Santa Barbara
 The Faculty Club (1963)
 The Santa Barbara Club (1892)
 The University Club of Santa Barbara (1923)

 Stockton
 The Yosemite Club (1888–2010), insolvent

Colorado
 Colorado Springs
 The El Paso Club (1877)
 Denver
 The Cactus Club (1911)
 The Denver Athletic Club (1884)
 The Denver Club (1880–1995), Denver's oldest club, insolvent; had contained two singles and one doubles squash courts
 The Denver Petroleum Club (1948)
 The Denver Press Club (1877), the oldest existing press club in the United States
 The University Club of Denver (1891)

Connecticut
 Greenwich
 The Field Club (1908)
 Hartford
 The Hartford Club (1873)

 New Haven
 The Graduate Club (1892)
 Mory's Association (1849)
 The New Haven Lawn Club (1891)
 The Quinnipiack Club (1871)

 New London
 The Thames Club (1869)
 Waterbury
 The Waterbury Club (1881–2009), insolvent

Delaware
 Wilmington
 The Wilmington Club (1855)
 The University Club of Wilmington (1924–1958), merged with the Wilmington Whist Club to become the University and Whist Club
 The University and Whist Club (1891)

District of Columbia
 Washington
 The Alibi Club (1884) abandoned 
 The Army and Navy Club (1885)
 The Arts Club of Washington (1916)
 The Capitol Hill Club (The National Republican Club) (1951)
 The City Tavern Club (1959)
 The Cosmos Club (1878)
 The George Town Club (1966)
 The Metropolitan Club (1863)
 The National Press Club (1908)
 The Racquet Club of Washington (1920–1936), merged into the University Club of Washington, D.C.
 The Sulgrave Club (1922)
 The University Club of Washington, DC (1904)
 The Washington Club (1891–2013), merged into the University Club of Washington, D.C.

Florida
 Jacksonville
 The River Club of Jacksonville (1954)
 Miami
 The Bankers Club (1972–2014),
 The Brickell Club (1988–1995), insolvent
 The City Club (1984–1994), merged with the Miami Club to become the Miami City Club
 The Miami City Club (1994–2011), insolvent
 The Miami Club (1921–1994), merged with the City Club to become the Miami City Club
 The Standard Club of Greater Miami (1961–1990), insolvent
 The University Club of Miami(1954–1995), insolvent
 Naples
 The Collier Athletic Club (1985–2010), insolvent
 Orlando
 The University Club of Orlando (1926)
 North Palm Beach
 The City Club of the Palm Beaches (1990–2010), insolvent
 Sarasota
 The University Club of Sarasota (1969–2009), insolvent
 Surfside
 The Surf Club (1930)
 Tallahassee
 The Governor's Club (1982)
 Tampa
 The Tampa Club (1982)
 The University Club of Tampa (1946)

Georgia
 Atlanta
 The Burns Club Atlanta (1896)
 The Capital City Club (1883)
 The Cherokee Town and Country Club (1956)
 The Georgian Club (1982–2020)
 The Piedmont Driving Club (1887)
 The Standard Club (1866–1983), moved to Johns Creek, Georgia, and became a country club

 Augusta
 The Pinnacle Club (1967)
 Macon
 The City Club of Macon (1992–2008), insolvent
 The Side Porch Lounge of Stanislaus (2005)
 Savannah
 The Chatham Club (1968)
 The Oglethorpe Club (1870)

Hawaii
 Honolulu
 The Commercial Club (1906–1963), insolvent
 The Pacific Club (1851)
 The University Club of Honolulu (1905–1930), merged into the Pacific Club
 Outrigger Canoe Club (1908)

Idaho
 Boise
 The Arid Club (1890)

Illinois
 Chicago
 The Arts Club of Chicago
 The Casino Club (1914)
 The Caxton Club (1895)
 The Chicago Athletic Association (1890–2007), insolvent
 The Chicago Club (1869)
 Chicago Yacht Club
 The Cliff Dwellers Club (1907)
 The Covenant Club
 Columbia Yacht Club of Chicago
 Lake Shore Athletic Club (1927–1977)
 The Metropolitan Club
 The Mid America Club
 The Quadrangle Club (1893)
 The Racquet Club of Chicago (1923)
 The Sky-Line Club
 The Tavern Club
 The Tower Club
 The Standard Club (1869)
 The Union League of Chicago (1879)
 The University Club of Chicago (1887)

 Decatur
 The Decatur Club (1883)
 Moline
 The Moline Commercial Club (1907–1933), insolvent
 Oakbrook Terrace
 The DuPage Club (1984)
 Peoria
 The Creve Coeur Club (1894)
 Rockford
 The University Club of Rockford (1911)
 Springfield
 The Sangamo Club (1890)
 Wilmette
 The Michigan Shores Club (1904), until 1943 called the Shawnee Club

Indiana
 Bloomington
 The University Club of Indiana University (1958)
 Evansville
 The Evansville Petroleum Club (1948–2006), insolvent
 Fort Wayne
 The Summit Club (c.1967–2008), insolvent
 Indianapolis
 The Antelope Club (1947) 
 The Columbia Club (1889)
 The Indianapolis Athletic Club (1920–2004), insolvent
 The Indianapolis Press Club (1934–2004), insolvent, but still operates a charitable foundation
 IUPUI University Club (1988) 
 The University Club of Indianapolis (1893)
 The Marion Club (1888–1928), insolvent and sold clubhouse 

 New Albany
 The Calumet Club (1919–1932), ceased existence but held reunions up until 1975
 South Bend
 The Summit Club (1967–2012), insolvent

Iowa
 Davenport
 The Davenport Club (1945–1993), insolvent
 The Outing Club (1891)

 Des Moines
 The Des Moines Club (1909–2002), merged with the Embassy Club to become the Des Moines Embassy Club
 The Des Moines Embassy Club (1909), formed in 2002 from the merger of the Embassy Club and Des Moines Club
 The Embassy Club (1946–2002), merged with the Des Moines Club to become the Des Moines Embassy Club
 Iowa City
 The University Club of Iowa City (1917–2018)

Kansas
 Hutchinson
 The Hutchinson Town Club (1947)
 Kansas City
 The Kansas City Athletic Club (1887)
 Topeka
 The Top of the Tower Club (1968)
 Wichita
 The Petroleum Club of Wichita (1949)
 The Wichita Club (1889–1996), merged into the Petroleum Club of Wichita

Kentucky
 Covington
 The Metropolitan Club (1991)
 Lexington
 The Club at Spindletop Hall (1965)
 The Lexington Club (1860)
 Louisville
 The Pendennis Club (1881)
 The University Club of Louisville (1991)
 The Louisville Thoroughbred Society (2018)

 Owensboro
 The Campbell Club (1959) – Permanently closed on December 21, 2018

Louisiana
 Baton Rouge
 The Camelot Club (1967) The Camelot Club is now defunct.
 The City Club (1957)

 Lafayette
 The Petroleum Club of Lafayette (1953)
 Lake Charles
 The Pioneer Club (1948)
 Monroe
 The Lotus Club (1920)
 Morgan City
 The Petroleum Club of Morgan City (1966)
 New Orleans
 The Boston Club (1841), oldest in the South.
 Louisiana Debating and Literary Association (1872)
 Le Moyne de Bienville Club (1964)
 The New Orleans Athletic Club (1872)
 The Pickwick Club (1857)
 The Round Table Club (1898)
 The Stratford Club (1897)
 The Zulu Social Aid & Pleasure Club(1909)

 Shreveport
 The Cambridge Club (1982–2009), insolvent
 The Petroleum Club of Shreveport (1948)
 The Shreveport Club (1946)
 The University Club of Shreveport (1979–2011), insolvent

Maine
 Bangor
 The Tarratine Club (1884–1991)
 Portland
 The Cumberland Club (1877)
 The Portland Club (1886)
 The Woodfords Club (1913)

Maryland
 Baltimore
 The Center Club (1962)
 The Engineers Club (1905)
 The Johns Hopkins Club (1899)
 The Maryland Club (1857)

 South River
 The South River Club (c.1690); oldest existing gentlemen's club in North America

Massachusetts
 Amherst
 The University of Massachusetts University Club (1935)
 Andover
 The Lanam Club (1957)

 Boston
 The Algonquin Club (1885)
 The Anthology Club (1804–1811), which founded the Boston Athenæum
 The Boston Athletic Association (1887–1936), lost clubhouse amidst the Great Depression, continues to exist as a society organizing races, including the Boston Marathon
 The Boston City Club (1906)
 The Badminton & Tennis Club (1908)
 The Boston College Club (1913)
 The Club of Odd Volumes (1887)
 The Harvard Club of Boston (1908)
 The Massachusetts Charitable Mechanic Association (1795–1959), lost clubhouse and moved to Quincy, Massachusetts, where it became a charity fund
 The St. Botolph Club (1880)
 The Somerset Club (1852)
 The Tavern Club (1884)
 The Tennis and Racquet Club (1902)
 The Union Boat Club (1851)
 The Union Club of Boston (1863)
 The University Club of Boston (1891)
 The Wardroom Club of Boston (1899), Founded in 1899 as a direct result of the Spanish–American War, is based in the old Charlestown Navy Yard

 Cambridge
 The Harvard Faculty Club (1920)
 Fall River
 The Quequechan Club (1861)

 Fitchburg
 The Fay Club (1910)

 Lenox
 The Lenox Club (1864)
 Lowell
 The Yorick Club (1882–1979), insolvent

 New Bedford
 The Wamsutta Club (1866)
 Newburyport
 The Dalton Club (1898)
 Plymouth
 The Old Colony Club (1769), third oldest existing gentlemen's club in the United States (behind the South River Club and the Schuylkill Fishing Company)
 Quincy
 The Neighborhood Club (1916)
 Springfield
 The Colony Club (1915)
 Worcester
 The Worcester Club (1888)

Michigan
 Calumet
 The Miscowaubik Club (1903)

 Detroit
 The Book Club of Detroit (1957)
 The Detroit Athletic Club (1887)
 The Detroit Club (1882)
 The Detroit Racquet Club (1902)
 The Harmonie Club (1849–1974), insolvent
 The Players (1910)

 East Lansing
 The University Club of Michigan State University (1962)
 Grand Rapids
 The Peninsular Club (1881–2008), insolvent
 The Press Club (1953–2004), merged into the University Club of Grand Rapids
 The University Club of Grand Rapids (1923)
 Iron Mountain
 The Chippewa Club (1945)
 Kalamazoo
 The Beacon Club (1947)
 The Park Club of Kalamazoo(1904)
 Saginaw
 The Saginaw Club (1889)

Minnesota
 Bloomington
 The Decathlon Club (1968–2000), was damaged in fire and did not reopen
 Duluth
 Kitchi Gammi Club (1883)

 Minneapolis
 The Campus Club (1911)
 The Minneapolis Athletic Club (1915–1998), insolvent
 The Minneapolis Club (1883)
 Saint Paul
 The Minnesota Club (1910–2000), insolvent
 The St. Paul Athletic Club (1917–1991), insolvent
 The University Club of Saint Paul (1912)

Mississippi
 Gulfport
 The Great Southern Club (1988)
 Jackson
 The Capital Club (1947)

Missouri
 Clayton
 The Saint Louis Club (1961)
 The University Club of St. Louis (1872–2007), insolvent
 The Whittemore House Club (1969)

 Columbia
 The University Club of Missouri University (1895)
 Kansas City
 The Kansas City Athletic Club (1887–1997), moved to Kansas City, Kansas
 The Kansas City Club (1882–2015), moved and merged into the University Club at the latter's premises; the merged club adopted the Kansas City Club name (2001); insolvent (2015)
 The Progress Club (1881–1928), moved and became the Oakwood Country Club
 The River Club (1948)
 The University Club of Kansas City (1901–2001), remaining at the same premises, merged with, and adopted the name of, the Kansas City Club

 Springfield
 The Tower Club (1987–2017), closed in early 2017 and reopened as a public venue 
 St. Joseph
 The Benton Club (1887)

 St. Louis
 The Missouri Athletic Club (1903), which awards the Hermann Trophy
 The Noonday Club (1893–2008), merged into the Missouri Athletic Club
 The Racquet Club of St. Louis (1906), which funded Charles Lindbergh's Spirit of St. Louis
 The St. Louis Club (1886–1925), was damaged in fire and did not reopen
 The University Club of St. Louis (1872–1974), moved to Clayton, Missouri

Montana
 Billings
 The Billings Petroleum Club (1954)
 Butte
 The Silver Bow Club (1906–1930), insolvent

 Helena
 Montana Club (1885) Its 1905 new building was designed by noted architect Cass Gilbert with attention to style of traditional London gentlemen's clubs. NRHP-listed within Helena Historic District. Its floor design includes white swastikas.
 Miles City
 The Miles City Club (1884)

Nebraska
 Lincoln
 The Nebraska Club (1954)
 The University Club of Lincoln (1923–1999), insolvent, members joined Nebraska Club
 Omaha
 The Omaha Press Club (1955)

New Hampshire
 Portsmouth
 The One Hundred Club (2003)
 The Warwick Club (1892)

New Jersey
 Florham Park
 The Park Avenue Club (1894)
 Montclair
 The Commonwealth Club (1904)
 Morristown
 The Morristown Club (1884)
 Newark
 The 744 Club (1958–1991), insolvent
 The Downtown Club (1914–1983), insolvent
 The Essex Club (1876–1992), insolvent
 The Newark Athletic Club (1850–1965), insolvent
 New Brunswick
 The Rutgers Club (1957)
 Ocean City
 The Riverboat Club (1964–2017), closed due to expensive fire code violations
 Princeton
 The Nassau Club (1889)
 The Prospect House Club (1968)

 Trenton
 The Trenton Club (1884–2013), insolvent

New Mexico
 Albuquerque
 The Albuquerque Petroleum Club (1956–2007), insolvent
 The Albuquerque Press Club (1965)

New York
 Albany
 The Fort Orange Club (1880)
 The University Club of Albany (1901)

 Binghamton
 The Binghamton Club (1880)
 Buffalo
 The Buffalo Club (1867)
 The Saturn Club (1885)
 The University Club of Buffalo (1894–1980), insolvent

 Elmira
 The Elmira City Club (1889)
 Jamestown
 The Jamestown Town Club (1929)
 New York City
 Clubs affiliated with university alumni groups:
 The Cornell Club of New York (1889)
 The Harvard Club of New York (1887)
 The Columbia University Club of New York (1901–1973), continues to exist "in residence" at The Penn Club of New York
 The NYU Club lost clubhouse in 1989, continues to exist "in residence" at the Princeton Club of New York
 The Penn Club of New York City (1901)
 The Princeton Club of New York (1866; incorporated as Club 1899)
 The Williams Club (1913–2010), lost clubhouse, continues to exist "in residence" at the Penn Club of New York
 The Yale Club of New York City (1897), the largest private club in the world, which awarded the Heisman Trophy in 2002 and 2003
 The Brook (1903)
 The Century Association (1847)
 The Coffee House Club (1914)
 The Chemists' Club (1898–1970), lost clubhouse, continues to exist as an "inner club" of the Penn Club of New York City
 The Collectors Club of New York (1896)
 The Down Town Association (1859)
 The Downtown Athletic Club (1926–2002), founded the Heisman Trophy and awarded it each year until irreparably damaged in the September 11 attacks
 The Engineers' Club (1888–1979), insolvent and lost clubhouse
 The Explorers Club (1904)
 The Friars' Club (1904)
 The Grolier Club (1884)
 The Harmonie Club (1852)
 The India House Club (1914)
 The Knickerbocker Club (1871)
 The Leash (1925)
 The Links Club (1921)
 The Lotos Club (1870)
 The Metropolitan Club (1891)
 The Montauk Club (1891)
 The National Arts Club (1898)
 The New York Athletic Club (1868)
 The New York Yacht Club (1844)
 The Nippon Club (1905)
 The Norwood Club (2007)
 The Players (1888)
 The Racquet and Tennis Club (1876)
 The River Club of New York (1929)
 The Salmagundi Club (1871)
 The Soldiers', Sailors', Marines', Coast Guard and Airmen's Club (1919)
 The Spanish Benevolent Society (1868)
 The Squadron A Association (1884–1941), lost clubhouse, continues to exist as an "inner club" of the Women's National Republican Club
 The Union Club (1836), second oldest existing gentlemen's city club in the United States behind The Philadelphia Club)
 The Union League Club of New York (1863)
 The University Club of New York (1865)
 The Whitehall Club (1908–1992)

 Poughkeepsie
 The Amrita Club (1873–1980), insolvent

 Rochester
 The Genesee Valley Club (1885)
 The University Club of Rochester (1909–1999), insolvent

 Schenectady
 The Mohawk Club (1885)
 Syracuse
 The Century Club of Syracuse (1876)
 The Pastime Athletic Club (1892)
 Utica
 The City Club of Utica (1888–1975), insolvent
 The Fort Schuyler Club (1883)

North Carolina
 Charlotte
 The Charlotte Athletic Club (1968–1991), merged into the Tower Club
 The Charlotte City Club (1947)
 The Tower Club (1984–2004), merged into the Charlotte City Club
 Durham
 The University Club of North Carolina (1987)
 Gastonia
 The City Club of Gastonia (1985–2012), insolvent
 Greensboro
 The Greensboro City Club (1971–2005), insolvent
 Hickory
 The Hickory Sportsman's Club (1985)
 High Point
 The String and Splinter Club (1957)
 Raleigh
 The Capital City Club (1979–2009), merged with the Cardinal Club to become the Downtown Clubs of Raleigh
 The Cardinal Club (1979–2009), merged with the Capital City Club to become the Downtown Clubs of Raleigh
 The Downtown Clubs of Raleigh (1979)
 Wilmington
 The Cape Fear Club (1866)
 The City Club at de Rosset (1998)
 Winston-Salem
 The Piedmont Club (1986)
 The Twin City Club (1885–2010), insolvent

Ohio
 Akron
 The Akron City Club (1915–2003), insolvent
 Cincinnati
 The Bankers Club (1946–2009), insolvent
 The Business Men's Club (1896–1924), merged into the Cincinnati Club
 The Cincinnati Athletic Club (1853)
 The Cincinnati Club (1889–1983), insolvent
 The Cincinnati Faculty Club (1968)
 The Cincinnati Women's Club (1894) 
 The Cuvier Press Club (1911–1973), insolvent
 The Literary Club of Cincinnati (1849)
 Miami Boat Club (1897) 
 The Phoenix Club (1859–1911), merged into the Business Men's Club
 Stumps (1900) 
 The Queen City Club (1874)
 The University Club of Cincinnati (1879)

 Cleveland
 The Cleveland Athletic Club (1908–2007), insolvent
 The Cleveland Club (1872–1939), insolvent amidst the Great Depression
 The Hermit Club (1904)
 The Rowfant Club (1892)
 The Tavern Club (1892)
 The Union Club (1872)
 The University Club of Cleveland (1898–2002), insolvent

 Columbus
 The Athletic Club of Columbus (1916)
 Aubergine Private Dining Club (1990) 
 Columbus Club (1886)
 The Ohio State University Faculty Club (1939)

 Dayton
 The Engineers Club of Dayton (1914)

 Massillon
 The Massillon Club (1917–2011), insolvent
 Toledo
 The Toledo Club (1889)

 Youngstown
 The Youngstown Club (1902–2012), insolvent

Oklahoma
 Edmond
 The Petroleum Club of Oklahoma City (1956)
 Norman
 The University Club of the University of Oklahoma (1925)
 Oklahoma City
 The Beacon Club (1942–2017), insolvent
 The Petroleum Club of Oklahoma City (1956)
 Tulsa
 The Summit (1967)
 The Tulsa Petroleum Club (1950–2011), insolvent
 The Tulsa Press Club (1906)
 Tulsa Club Hotel (1927), originally the Tulsa Club

Oregon
 Eugene
 The Town Club (1950–2007), insolvent
 Portland
 The Arlington Club (1867)
 The Founders Club (1984)
 The Multnomah Athletic Club (1891)
 The University Club of Portland (1898)

Pennsylvania
 Andalusia
 The Schuylkill Fishing Company (1732), second-oldest existing gentlemen's club in North America (behind the South River Club)
 Bethlehem
 The Bethlehem Club (1909–2007), insolvent
 The University Club of Bethlehem (1911)

 Catasauqua
 The Catasauqua Club (1897)
 Easton
 The Pomfret Club (1882)
 Erie
 The Erie Club (1882)

 Harrisburg
 The Tuesday Club (1962–2002), insolvent Replaced by the Hill Society.
 Lancaster
 The Hamilton Club (1889) 
 Philadelphia
 The Down Town Club (1897–1995), insolvent and reopened as public event space
 The Engineers Club of Philadelphia (1877–1990), lost clubhouse, continues to exist as an "inner club" of the Racquet Club of Philadelphia
 The Franklin Inn Club (1902)
 The Locust Club (1926–1999), insolvent
 The Mask and Wig Club (1889)
 The Midday Club (1929–1978), insolvent
 The Pen & Pencil Club (1892)
 The Penn Club of Philadelphia (1875)
 The Philadelphia Club (1834), fourth oldest existing gentlemen's club in the United States (behind the South River Club, the Schuylkill Fishing Company, and the Old Colony Club)
 The Poor Richard Club (1925–1980), insolvent
 The Princeton Club (1868–1979), insolvent
 The Racquet Club of Philadelphia (1889)
 The Rittenhouse Club (1883–1991), lost clubhouse, continues to exist as an "inner club" of the Acorn Club, a women's club
 The Union League of Philadelphia (1862)
 The University Club at Penn (1898), previously called the Lenape Club
 The Vesper Club (1901–2012), lost clubhouse, briefly continued to exist as an "inner club" of the Racquet Club of Philadelphia, but then was evicted from Racquet Club when refused to obey a new, clubwide smoking ban<ref name=vesperclub>Stu Bykofsky, "Recalling the Vesper Club's 'Mad Men' days," Philadelphia Inquirer" (Sept. 21, 2012)</ref>

 Pittsburgh
 The Allegheny Harvard-Yale-Princeton Club (1930)
 The Concordia Club (1874–2009), insolvent
 The Duquesne Club (1873)
 The Pittsburgh Athletic Association (1908)
 The Union Club of Pittsburgh (1903)
 The University Club of Pittsburgh (1923)Bill Schackner, "Remodeled University Club Set to Reopen," Pittsburgh Post-Gazette (Mar. 30, 2009)

 Pottsville
 The Pottsville Club (1888)
 Scranton
 The Scranton Club (1895–2010), insolvent
 State College
 The University Club of State College (1908)

 Wilkes-Barre
 The Westmoreland Club (1873)Denise Allabaugh, "Westmoreland Club celebrates platinum status," Wilkes-Barre Citizens' Voice (Oct. 18, 2009)
 Wilkinsburg
 The Pennwood Club (1904–1916)
 Williamsport
 The Ross Club (1890).Mike Reuther, "Ross Club expects better year with new leadership," Williamsport Sun-Gazette (Jan. 6, 2013) 'To the best of my knowledge the Ross Club is now defunct. The building was acquired by the First Community Foundation of PA'''
 York
 The Lafayette Club (1898–2012), insolvent

Rhode Island
 East Providence
 The Squantum Association (1870)

 Newport
 The Clambake Club of Newport (1895)
 The New York Yacht Club (1844) (summer station)
 The Newport Reading Room (1854)

 Pawtucket
 The To Kalon Club (1867–2010), insolvent
 Providence
 The Hope Club (1875)
 The Turk's Head Club (defunct)
 The University Club of Providence (1899)

South Carolina
 Aiken
 The Aiken Tennis Club (1898)
 The Green Boundary Club (1956)
 Camden
 The Springdale Hall Club (1950)
 Charleston
 The Charleston Club (1852)
 Columbia
 The Palmetto Club (1956)
 The Summit Club (1972–2010), merged into the Palmetto Club
 Greenville
 The Poinsett Club (1935)
 Rock Hill
 The City Club of Rock Hill (1998)
 Spartanburg
 The Piedmont Club (1941)

Tennessee
 Chattanooga
 The Mountain City Club (1889)
 The Walden Club (1975)
 Knoxville
 The Claus Von Bulow Club (1984-86)
 The Bourbon Club (2019-present) 
 Memphis
 The Racquet Club of Memphis (1957)
 The Rex Club (1861–1942), moved and became the Ridgeway Country Club
 The Summit Club (1972–2003), insolvent
 The Tennessee Club (1875–1987), insolvent
 The University Club of Memphis (1907)
 Nashville
 The Nashville City Club (1957)
 The University Club of Nashville (1962–2018)

Texas
 Abilene
 The Petroleum Club of Abilene (1950–2000), insolvent
 Amarillo
 The Amarillo Club (1947)
 Austin
 The Austin Club (1949)
 The Campus Club (1972)
 The University Club 
 The Headliner's Club of Austin (1945) 

 Beaumont
 The Beaumont Club (1921)
 Corpus Christi
 The Corpus Christi Town Club (1952–2015), declared bankruptcy and closed.
 Dallas
 The City Club (1918)
 The Dallas Petroleum Club (1934)
 The Faculty Club of Southern Methodist University (1921)
 The Park City Club (1984)
 Salesmanship Club of Dallas (1920)
 El Paso
 The El Paso Club (1963)
 Fort Worth
 The City Club of Fort Worth (1984)
 The Fort Worth Club (1885), named the Commercial Club until 1906
 The Petroleum Club of Fort Worth (1953)

 Houston
 The Briar Club (1949)
 The Coronado Club (1956)
 The Houston Club (1894)
 The Petroleum Club of Houston (1946)

 Longview
 The Summit Club (1980)
 Lubbock
 The Lubbock Club (1951–2010), insolvent
 Midland
 The Petroleum Club of Midland (1947)
 San Antonio
 The Argyle Club (1955)
 Club Giraud (1983)
 The Petroleum Club of San Antonio (1980)
 The San Antonio Club (1945–2005), insolvent
 The St. Anthony Club (1956–1993), insolvent
 Wichita Falls
 The Wichita Club (1918–2010), insolvent

Utah
 Salt Lake City
 The Alta Club (1883)
 The University Club of Salt Lake City (1904–1993), insolvent

Vermont
 Burlington
 The Ethan Allen Club (1857–2010), insolvent

Virginia
 Charlottesville
 Red-land Club (1905)
 The Colonnade Club (1907)
 Norfolk
 The Harbor Club (1968–2007), insolvent
 The Virginia Club (1873)
 Richmond
 The 2300 Club (1964–2017)
 The Bull and Bear Club (1966–2015)
 The Commonwealth Club (1890)
 The Downtown Club (1953–2006), insolvent

 Roanoke
 The Shenandoah Club (1893) is the oldest, continuously operating private club in Virginia.
 Virginia Beach
 The Town Center City Club (2003)
 Warrenton
 The Fauquier Club (1902)

Washington
 Bellevue
 The Harbor Club (1959)
 The Bellevue Club (1979)
 Seattle
 The Arctic Club (1908–1971), insolvent
 The College Club of Seattle (1910)
 The Harbor Club (1959–2015)
 The Rainier Club (1888)
 The University Club of Seattle (1900)
 The University of Washington Club (1913)
 The Washington Athletic Club (1930)

 Spokane
 The Spokane Club (1890)

Wisconsin
 La Crosse
 The La Crosse Club (1882)
 Madison
 The Madison Club (1909)
 The University Club of the University of Wisconsin (1906)

 Milwaukee
 The Milwaukee Athletic Club (1882)
 The Milwaukee Club (1882)
 The University Club of Milwaukee (1898)
 The Wisconsin Club (formerly the Deutscher Club) (1891)

 Racine
 The Somerset Club (1892)
 Wausau
 The Wausau Club (1901–2004), insolvent

Wyoming
 Casper
 The Casper Petroleum Club (1949–2016), closed permanently on October 1, 2016

See also 
 List of gentlemen's clubs in India
 List of gentlemen's clubs in London
 List of gentlemen's clubs in Sri Lanka
 List of traditional gentlemen's and working men's club buildings
 List of women's club buildings

Further reading 
 
 "Club men of New York: their occupations, and business and home addresses", New York : The Republic press [etc.], 1893. Cf. starting at p. 39.
 Seth Alexander Thévoz, Global Clubs Directory

Notes 

 
Gentlemen's clubs
United States